Steve Morrison (born 15 August 1961) is a Scottish former footballer manager of East Stirlingshire who play association football in the Scottish Football League Third Division. He was assisted by former Rangers and Everton defender Alex Cleland.

Morrison replaced Danny Divers, whom he had previously assisted, in March 2003. He was succeeded by Dennis Newell following his resignation on April 2004 after failing to get the Shire off the bottom of the league.

He also had an eight-month stint as manager at Clydebank. As a player, he played in midfield for numerous Scottish clubs, most notably Dunfermline Athletic.

References

Scottish footballers
Aberdeen F.C. players
Dunfermline Athletic F.C. players
Hamilton Academical F.C. players
Dumbarton F.C. players
Clyde F.C. players
Alloa Athletic F.C. players
Clydebank F.C. (1965) players
Larne F.C. players
Scottish football managers
Clydebank F.C. (1965) managers
East Stirlingshire F.C. managers
Living people
1961 births
Ardrossan Winton Rovers F.C. players
Largs Thistle F.C. players
Scottish Football League managers
Association football midfielders
Scottish Junior Football Association players